Albrecht Fröhlich FRS (22 May 1916 – 8 November 2001) was a German-born British mathematician, famous for his major results and conjectures on Galois module theory in the Galois structure of rings of integers.

Education
He was born in Munich to a Jewish family.  He fled from the Nazis to France, and then to Palestine.  He went to Bristol University in 1945, gaining a Ph.D in 1951 with a dissertation entitled On Some Topics in the Theory of Representation of Groups and Individual Class Field Theory  under the supervision of Hans Heilbronn.  He was a lecturer at the University of Leicester and then at the Keele University, then in 1962 moved as reader to King's College London where he worked until his retirement in 1981 when he moved to Robinson College, Cambridge.

Awards
He was elected a Fellow of the Royal Society in 1976. He was awarded the Berwick Prize of the London Mathematical Society in 1976 and its De Morgan Medal in 1992. The Society's Fröhlich Prize is named in his honour.

Personal
He is the brother of Herbert Fröhlich.

References

External links
Memorial note in LMS newsletter
Obituary in German
The papers of Albrecht Fröhlich have just been processed by the NCUACS, Bath, England . They can be consulted in the Archives of King's College, London

1916 births
2001 deaths
20th-century English mathematicians
20th-century British mathematicians
Academics of Keele University
Academics of the University of Leicester
Academics of King's College London
Jewish emigrants from Nazi Germany to France
Fellows of the Royal Society
Fellows of Robinson College, Cambridge
Alumni of the University of Bristol
Academics of the University of Bristol